The Philadelphia La Scala Opera Company (defunct) was an American opera company located in Philadelphia, Pennsylvania that was actively performing at the Academy of Music between 1925 and 1954. In 1955 the company merged with the Philadelphia Civic Grand Opera Company to form the Philadelphia Grand Opera Company.

History
Founded under the name La Scala Grand Opera Company, the company's first production was of Giuseppe Verdi's La traviata on May 4, 1925 with Josephine Lucchese as Violetta, Dimitri Onofrei as Alfredo, Elia Palma as Giorgio, and Fulgenzio Guerrieri conducting. The company presented fifteen more operas during the 1925-1926 season including Gaetano Donizetti's Lucia di Lammermoor (with Rosalinda Rudko-Morini in the title role, Giuseppe Reschiglian as Edgardo, and Emanuel Nugnez as Enrico), Giuseppe Verdi's Aida (with Alice Eversman in the title role and Bernardo de Muro as Radames), Verdi's Rigoletto, Cavalleria rusticana (with Emilia Vergeri as Santuzza), and Pagliacci (with Nicola Zerola as Canio) among others.

After its first season, Francesco Pelosi was appointed General Manager and Artistic Director of the company in 1926. For the second season the company was renamed the Philadelphia La Scala Grand Opera Company which it performed under until 1938 when the company's title was shortened to the Philadelphia La Scala Opera Company. Pelosi served as director until his sudden death in a car accident in 1948. He was succeeded by Humbert A. Pelosi who served the company as General Manager and Artistic Director for the rest of its history. Carlo Moresco was the company's primary conductor from 1950-1954.

During its history, the PLOC typically presented 12 operas each year at the Academy of Music during its annual season, giving over 350 opera performances at the house by the end of its final season. The company's last season was the 1953-1954 which was cut short due to financial reasons. The company's last performance was of Georges Bizet's Carmen on April 29, 1954 with Gloria Lane in the title role, David Poleri as Don José, Rutilio del Vecchio as Escamillo, Dora Marasco as Micaëla, and Moresco conducting. In November 1954 the company merged with the Philadelphia Civic Grand Opera Company to form the Philadelphia Grand Opera Company.

Notable performers

Adele Addison
Licia Albanese
John Alexander
Gino Bechi
Carlo Bergonzi
Elisabeth Carron
Walter Cassel
Mary Costa
Mary Curtis Verna
Mario del Monaco
Giuseppe Di Stefano
Lucia Evangelista
Edith Evans
Giulio Gari
Joann Grillo
Frank Guarrera
Andréa Guiot
Thomas Hayward
Laurel Hurley
Herva Nelli
Norman Kelley
Flaviano Labò
Albert Lance
Bruno Landi
Brenda Lewis
Eva Likova
Thomas Lo Monaco
Chester Ludgin
Jean Madeira
Elaine Malbin
Andrew McKinley 
Michael Minsky
Licinio Montefusco
Nicolai Moscona
Birgit Nilsson
Gino Penno
Roberta Peters
Irra Petina
 Rudolf Petrak
 Claudia Pinza Bozzolla
Giacinto Prandelli
Louis Quilico
Nell Rankin
Hilde Reggiani
Regina Resnik
Graciela Rivera
Stella Roman
Elinor Ross
Norman Scott
Louis Sgarro
Eleanor Steber
Teresa Stratas
Brian Sullivan
Ferruccio Tagliavini
Pia Tassinari
Richard Torigi
Norman Treigle
Richard Tucker
Claramae Turner
Jon Vickers
Ramón Vinay
Sandra Warfield
Robert Weede
Frances Yeend
Josephine Zumpano

References

External links
Frank Hamilton's Database of Opera in Philadelphia

Musical groups established in 1925
Musical groups disestablished in 1954
Culture of Philadelphia
Pennsylvania opera companies
Musical groups from Philadelphia
1925 establishments in Pennsylvania
1954 disestablishments in Pennsylvania